Anatoly Bogovik (born 6 October 1947) is a Soviet and Ukrainian football manager and former player. He also spent a large part of his career in Belarus and currently holds Belarusian citizenship.

Bogovik spent the majority of his playing career playing for Dynamo Kyiv and Dinamo Minsk, helping the former to win the champions title in 1971.

References

External links
 
 Anatoly Bogovik 2008 interview with Pressball

1947 births
Living people
Soviet footballers
Belarusian footballers
Ukrainian footballers
FC Polissya Zhytomyr players
FC Dynamo Kyiv players
FC Dinamo Minsk players
FC Dnepr Mogilev players
Soviet football managers
Soviet expatriate football managers
Expatriate football managers in Yemen
Belarusian football managers
Belarusian expatriate football managers
Yemen national football team managers
FC Shakhtyor Soligorsk managers
Association football midfielders
People from Kamianske
Sportspeople from Dnipropetrovsk Oblast